The 2022 French F4 Championship was the 12th season to run under the guise of the French F4 Championship and the fifth under the FIA Formula 4 regulations. The championship switched to Mygale M21-F4 chassis. The series began on 16 April at Circuit Paul Armagnac and ended on 16 October at Circuit Paul Ricard.

Alessandro Giusti won the championship with two races to spare.

Driver lineup

Race calendar 
Alongside the provisional entry list for the championship, the schedule was announced on 22 December 2021.

Championship standings

Points were awarded as follows:

Drivers' standings

Notes

References

External links 
Official website of the FFSA Academy

F4
French F4
French F4